Devlab is the seventh solo album by Canadian musician Devin Townsend, and his first ambient album. It was released on Townsend's label, HevyDevy Records, on December 4, 2004.

Track listing

External links
Devlab at HevyDevy

2004 albums
Devin Townsend albums
Albums produced by Devin Townsend